In arithmetic, a complex-base system is a positional numeral system whose radix is an imaginary (proposed by Donald Knuth in 1955) or complex number (proposed by S. Khmelnik in 1964 and Walter F. Penney in 1965).

In general
Let  be an integral domain , and  the (Archimedean) absolute value on it.

A number  in a positional number system is represented as an expansion
 
where
{| class="table left"
|-
|-
|  || || is the exponent (position or place),
|-
|  || || are digits from the finite set of digits , usually with 
|}
The cardinality  is called the level of decomposition.

A positional number system or coding system is a pair

 

with radix  and set of digits , and we write the standard set of digits with  digits as

 

Desirable are coding systems with the features:

In the real numbers 
In this notation our standard decimal coding scheme is denoted by

the standard binary system is

the negabinary system is

and the balanced ternary system is

In the complex numbers 
Well-known positional number systems for the complex numbers include the following ( being the imaginary unit):
 , e.g.   and
, the quater-imaginary base, proposed by Donald Knuth in 1955.

  and
 (see also the section Base −1 ± i below).

For  and  this is the system

 .
 , where the set  consists of complex numbers , and numbers , e.g.

 , where

Binary systems
Binary coding systems of complex numbers, i.e. systems with the digits , are of practical interest.
Listed below are some coding systems  (all are special cases of the systems above) and resp. codes for the (decimal) numbers .
The standard binary (which requires a sign, first line) and the "negabinary" systems (second line) are also listed for comparison.

As in all positional number systems with an Archimedean absolute value, there are some numbers with multiple representations. Examples of such numbers are shown in the right column of the table. All of them are repeating fractions with the repetend marked by a horizontal line above it.

If the set of digits is minimal, the set of such numbers has a measure of 0. This is the case with all the mentioned coding systems.

The almost binary quater-imaginary system is listed in the bottom line for comparison purposes. There, real and imaginary part interleave each other.

Base 

Of particular interest are the quater-imaginary base (base ) and the base  systems discussed below, both of which can be used to finitely represent the Gaussian integers without sign.

Connection to the twindragon 
The rounding region of an integer – i.e., a set  of complex (non-integer) numbers that share the integer part of their representation in this system – has in the complex plane a fractal shape: the twindragon (see figure). Thus,  contains all complex numbers with absolute value ≤ .

As a consequence, there is an injection of the complex rectangle
 
into the interval  of real numbers by mapping
 

Furthermore, there are the two mappings

and

both surjective, which give rise to a surjective (thus space-filling) mapping

which, however, is not continuous and thus not a space-filling curve. But a very close relative, the Davis-Knuth dragon, is continuous and a space-filling curve.

See also
Dragon curve

References

External links
"Number Systems Using a Complex Base" by Jarek Duda, the Wolfram Demonstrations Project
"The Boundary of Periodic Iterated Function Systems" by Jarek Duda, the Wolfram Demonstrations Project
"Number Systems in 3D" by Jarek Duda, the Wolfram Demonstrations Project

Non-standard positional numeral systems
Fractals

Ring theory